The McBarge, officially named the Friendship 500, is a former McDonald's restaurant, built on a  barge for Expo '86 in Vancouver, British Columbia. Moored on Expo grounds in Vancouver's False Creek, it was the second floating McDonald's location in the world (the first being in St. Louis, Missouri), intended to showcase future technology and architecture. Although the floating design allowed for the barge to operate in a new location following the exhibition, the derelict McBarge was anchored empty in Burrard Inlet from 1991, amid industrial barges and an oil refinery, until it was moved in December 2015 to Maple Ridge, British Columbia. Apart from brief use by its original owner, McDonald's, in 1986, the McBarge has never actively been used for anything and has been drifting from owner to owner for thirty-four years.

History 
The floating restaurant was designed by Robert Allan Ltd. for Expo 1986 and was one of five McDonald's locations on the Expo grounds, all of which were constructed for a total of $12 million. McDonald's originally intended to continue using it as a restaurant after Expo '86, but the barge remained empty at the Expo grounds until 1991, when the new owner of the grounds forced McDonald's to remove it. It has since been anchored derelict in Burrard Inlet, north of Burnaby, British Columbia.

In 2003, Marvel Entertainment and New Line Cinema rented the barge as a filming location for the 2004 film Blade: Trinity as the lair of the Nightstalkers.

In June 2009, the McBarge's current owner, Gastown developer Howard Meakin, submitted a proposal to the Mission city council for a waterfront development on the Fraser River, with the former McBarge as the centrepiece. Named "Sturgeon's on the Fraser", the development would include multiple restaurants and a marina complex, including paddlewheeler excursions and float plane service to Victoria and Nanaimo. As of August 2010, the proposal enjoyed local support, but awaited council approval. Concerns over float plane noise and other environmental issues meant the development was ultimately rejected.

Other proposals that have been put forward without owner interest include using the barge as a homeless shelter to alleviate overcrowding in Vancouver's current temporary shelters.

In December 2015, Meakin announced that the barge would soon be leaving Burrard Inlet after nearly 30 years. It was moved to Maple Ridge, British Columbia on December 22. The barge was scheduled for a $4.5-million refit there before being relocated to an undisclosed location.

In 2017, the barge's owners, alongside diving pioneer Phil Nuytten, announced plans to convert it into an attraction called the Deep Ocean Discovery Centre.  An event was planned for 21 October 2017 to launch a crowdfunding campaign, but was cancelled due to weather concerns. A petition to Vancouver City council to give the barge Historic Place Status received only 185 signatures. No mention has been made of a rescheduled event, its Facebook and Twitter have not been updated since 2017, and its YouTube account has been closed.

In 2020, it was reported that there were plans to refit the barge into a seafood restaurant, though a location had not been secured. Later in 2021 it was reported that an undisclosed site had been selected but was awaiting government approval.

References 

Buildings and structures in Vancouver
Restaurants in Vancouver
Floating restaurants
World's fair architecture in Vancouver
McDonald's buildings and structures
Expo 86